The Boeing F-15EX Eagle II is an American all-weather multirole strike fighter derived from the McDonnell Douglas F-15 Eagle.

Development 
In 2018, the USAF and Boeing discussed the F-15X, a proposed single-seat variant based on the F-15QA to replace USAF F-15C/Ds. Improvements included the AMBER weapons rack to carry up to 22 air-to-air missiles, infrared search and track, advanced avionics and electronics warfare equipment, AESA radar, and revised structure with a service life of 20,000 hours. Also known as Advanced F-15, both single and two seat variants were proposed, called F-15CX and F-15EX respectively, with identical capabilities. The USAF opted for the two–seat variant, which can be optionally flown by a single pilot or both pilot and WSO, the latter for complex missions and controlling "Loyal Wingman" UAVs in the future. One reason for this decision is that only two–seat F-15 models remained in production.

The USAF opted for the F-15EX to maintain fleet size as F-22 production ended, the F-35 was delayed, and its F-15Cs aged. Although it is not expected to be survivable against modern air defenses by 2028, the F-15EX can perform homeland and airbase defense, no-fly zone enforcement against limited air defenses, and deploy standoff munitions. In July 2020, the U.S. Defense Department ordered eight F-15EXs over three years for $1.2 billion. In August 2020, the USAF announced plans to replace F-15Cs in the Florida and Oregon Air National Guards with F-15EXs. The F-15EX made its maiden flight on 2 February 2021. The first F-15EX was delivered to the USAF in March 2021, and was flown to Eglin Air Force Base in Florida for further testing.

On 7 April 2021, its official name Eagle II was announced. The FY2021 defense appropriations bill funded F-15EX procurement at $1.23 billion for 12 aircraft for a total of 20 aircraft funded and ordered to-date. By May 2022, the USAF had orders for 144 F-15EXs; it has proposed reducing its orders to 80. First operational F-15EXs are not to receive conformal fuel tanks. The U.S. Air Force's proposed budget for the 2024 Fiscal Year includes a request for funds to buy 24 more F-15EX Eagle II fighter jets. This would bring the total planned fleet size up to 104 aircraft.

References

Citations

External links
 F-15E USAF fact sheet
 F-15 page, and F-15EX Super Eagle page on Boeing.com, Boeing F-15IA (Israeli Advanced) poster
 F-15E.info, Strike Eagle site

1980s United States fighter aircraft
Twinjets
F-15E Strike Eagle
F-015E Strike Eagle
Delta-wing aircraft
Aircraft first flown in 1986
Fourth-generation jet fighter
Twin-tail aircraft